In differential geometry of curves, the osculating circle of a sufficiently smooth plane curve at a given point p on the curve has been traditionally defined as the circle passing through p and a pair of additional points on the curve infinitesimally close to p.  Its center lies on the inner normal line, and its curvature defines the curvature of the given curve at that point. This circle, which is the one among all tangent circles at the given point that approaches the curve most tightly, was named circulus osculans (Latin for "kissing circle") by Leibniz.

The center and radius of the osculating circle at a given point are called center of curvature and radius of curvature of the curve at that point. A geometric construction was described by Isaac Newton in his Principia:

Nontechnical description
Imagine a car moving along a curved road on a vast flat plane.  Suddenly, at one point along the road, the steering wheel locks in its present position.  Thereafter, the car moves in a circle that "kisses" the road at the point of locking.  The curvature of the circle is equal to that of the road at that point.  That circle is the osculating circle of the road curve at that point.

Mathematical description

Let  be a regular parametric plane curve, where  is the arc length (the natural parameter).

Suppose that P is a point on γ where . The corresponding center of curvature is the point Q at distance R along N, in the same direction if k is positive and in the opposite direction if k is negative. The circle with center at Q and with radius R is called the osculating circle to the curve γ at the point P.

If C is a regular space curve then the osculating circle is defined in a similar way, using the principal normal vector N. It lies in the osculating plane, the plane spanned by the tangent and principal normal vectors T and N at the point P.

The plane curve can also be given in a different regular parametrization

where regular means that  for all . Then the formulas for the signed curvature k(t), the normal unit vector N(t), the radius of curvature R(t), and the center Q(t) of the osculating circle are

Cartesian coordinates 

If we do the calculations the results for the X and Y coordinates of the center of the osculating circle are:

Direct geometrical derivation 

 
 
Denoting , the first equation means that  is orthogonal to the unit tangent vector at : 
 
The second relation means that 
 
where 
 
is the curvature vector. In plane geometry,  is orthogonal to  because
 Therefore  and the radius of the osculating circle is precisely the inverse of the curvature.

Osculating circle as a  minimization problem 
Consider a curve  defined intrinsically by the equation
 
which we can envision as the section of the surface  by the plane . 
The normal  to the curve at a point  is the gradient at this point  
Therefore, the centers of the tangent circles  are given by 

where  is parameter.

The coordinates of a point  can be written as 
 
 
 
We can now evaluate the function  at the point  and its variation  . 
 
and this variation is zero if we choose 
 
Therefore the radius of the osculating circle is 

For an explicit function , we find the results of the preceding section.

Properties

For a curve C given by a sufficiently smooth parametric equations (twice continuously differentiable), the osculating circle may be obtained by a limiting procedure: it is the limit of the circles passing through three distinct points on C as these points approach P. This is entirely analogous to the construction of the tangent to a curve as a limit of the secant lines through pairs of distinct points on C approaching P.

The osculating circle S to a plane curve C at a regular point P can be characterized by the following properties:
 The circle S passes through P.
 The circle S and the curve C have the common tangent line at P, and therefore the common normal line.
 Close to P, the distance between the points of the curve C and the circle S in the normal direction decays as the cube or a higher power of the distance to P in the tangential direction.
This is usually expressed as "the curve and its osculating circle have the second or higher order contact" at P. Loosely speaking, the vector functions representing C and S agree together with their first and second derivatives at P.

If the derivative of the curvature with respect to s is nonzero at P then the osculating circle crosses the curve C at P. Points P at which the derivative of the curvature is zero are called vertices. If P is a vertex then C and its osculating circle have contact of order at least three. If, moreover, the curvature has a non-zero local maximum or minimum at P then the osculating circle touches the curve C at P but does not cross it.

The curve C may be obtained as the envelope of the one-parameter family of its osculating circles. Their centers, i.e. the centers of curvature,  form another curve, called the evolute of C. Vertices of C correspond to singular points on its evolute.

Within any arc of a curve C within which the curvature is monotonic (that is, away from any vertex of the curve), the osculating circles are all disjoint and nested within each other. This result is known as the Tait-Kneser theorem.

Examples

Parabola

For the parabola

the radius of curvature is

At the vertex   the radius of curvature equals  (see figure). The parabola has fourth order contact with its osculating circle there. For large  the radius of curvature increases ~ , that is, the curve straightens more and more.

Lissajous curve

A Lissajous curve with ratio of frequencies (3:2) can be parametrized as follows

It has signed curvature , normal unit vector  and radius of curvature  given by

and

See the figure for an animation. There the "acceleration vector" is the second derivative  with respect to the arc length .

Cycloid

A cycloid with radius  can be parametrized as follows:

Its curvature is given by the following formula:

which gives:

See also
Circle packing theorem
Osculating curve
Osculating sphere

Notes

Further reading
For some historical notes on the study of curvature, see

For application to maneuvering vehicles see
JC Alexander and JH Maddocks (1988): On the maneuvering of vehicles

External links

 
 math3d : osculating_circle

Circles
Differential geometry
Curves